Theodorus of Gadara was a Greek rhetorician of the 1st century BC from Gadara (present-day Um Qais, Jordan) who founded a rhetorical school in his native city.  According to the Suda he taught future Roman emperor Tiberius the art of rhetoric. Suetonius (c. 69 – after 122 AD) wrote of Tiberius that:

Theodorus was one of the two most famous rhetoric teachers of the time, the other being Apollodorus of Pergamon. Students of Apollodorus were commonly referred to as Apollodoreans, while students of Theodorus were known as Theodoreans.

He participated in sophistic contests with Potamo of Mytilene and Antipater in Rome. His son Antonius became a senator under Emperor Hadrian.

Works
According to the Suda, Theodorus wrote the following books, among others: 
On Questions in Pronunciation (Περὶ τῶν ἐν φωναῖς ζητουμένων, in 3 books)
On History (Περὶ ἱστορίας, 1 book)
On Thesis (Περὶ θέσεως, 1 book)
On the Similarity of Dialects and its Demonstration (Περὶ διαλέκτων ὁμοιότητος καὶ ἀποδείξεως, 2 books)
On the Constitution (Περὶ πολιτείας, 2 books)
On Coele Syria (Περὶ Κοίλης Συρίας, 1 book)
On the Capacity of the Orator (Περὶ ῥήτορος δυνάμεως, 1 book)

References

Roman-era Greeks
Ancient Greek rhetoricians